On 25 January 2023, two people were killed in a mass stabbing on a train in Brokstedt, Schleswig-Holstein, Germany.

Attack
At about 3 p.m. on 25 January 2023, a man stabbed nine people on a moving passenger train in Brokstedt, Steinburg, Schleswig-Holstein, in Northern Germany. The train was travelling from Kiel, Schleswig-Holstein to Hamburg and was carrying about 70 people. Two of the victims were killed and seven others injured, three of them severely. The deceased victims were identified as a 17-year-old girl and a 19-year-old boy. The attack allegedly ended when passengers restrained the attacker until the police arrived and arrested him at the train station in Brokstedt. The station was shut down to facilitate the ongoing emergency response efforts. The suspect, a young man who was also injured, was arrested and taken to hospital.

Suspect
According to Sabine Sütterlin-Waack, the interior minister of Schleswig-Holstein, the suspect in custody is a 33-year-old stateless man from the Palestinian territories was not known to be on any extremist watch lists, but the attack is under investigation. The suspect reportedly came to Germany in 2014, lived first in North Rhine-Westphalia and then in Schleswig-Holstein and was granted subsidiary protection in 2016. He was known to police for sexual and violent offenses and was in police custody until a week before the attack.

Reactions
Federal Interior Minister Nancy Faeser wrote on Twitter: "All our thoughts are with the victims of this awful crime and their families."

See also
Würzburg train attack

References

21st century in Schleswig-Holstein
Attacks in Europe in 2023
Attacks on transport
Crime in Schleswig-Holstein
Deaths by stabbing in Germany
January 2023 crimes in Europe
January 2023 events in Germany
Knife attacks
Mass stabbings in Germany
Stabbing attacks in 2023